Kennedy Secondary School is the combined middle school and high school located in Fergus Falls, Minnesota, United States. It currently serves over 2,000 students and is a part of the Fergus Falls Public Schools system. The official school colors are maroon and gold, and the athletic teams are known as "The Otters". The Senior High School was renamed from Fergus Falls Senior High School to Kennedy Secondary School at the beginning of the 20102011 school year when the school was relocated to the former Fergus Falls Middle School following a three-year rebuilding project of that school.

Athletics
Sports offered at Kennedy Secondary School:

Adaptive Bowling
Baseball
Basketball
Cross Country
Football
Golf
Gymnastics
Hockey
Robotics
Soccer
Softball
Speech
Swimming and Diving
Tennis
Track and Field
Volleyball
Wrestling

Presidential inaugural parades
In 2008, the Fergus Falls High School Marching band was selected out of 1300 applicants as one of 100 units to march in President Barack Obama's first inaugural parade. In 2012, the marching band was once again selected, this time out of 2800 applicants, to march in President Obama's second inaugural parade.

State titles
On March 5, 2011, the Boys Swimming and Diving team won the first state title in FFHS history. It came down to the final 400 freestyle relay. The Otters beat St. Thomas Academy by 1 point and Breck/Blake by 4 points. Although swimming is not a popular sport, it has consistently been FFHS's most successful sport in the last couple decades.

Notable alumni
Chad Daniels, comedian, 1993 graduate

References

External links
Fergus Falls Senior High School website

Public high schools in Minnesota
Schools in Otter Tail County, Minnesota
Public middle schools in Minnesota
Fergus Falls, Minnesota